Newbrook is a hamlet in central Alberta, Canada within Thorhild County.

The hamlet is located in Census Division No. 13 and in the federal riding of Westlock-St. Paul.

The hamlet and surrounding area has a strong Polish and Ukrainian influence, mostly from immigration at the turn of the 20th century. The former Newbrook Observatory, a meteor observatory that was the first facility in North America to photograph Sputnik 1, is located in the hamlet.

Demographics 

See also 
List of communities in Alberta
List of designated places in Alberta
List of hamlets in Alberta

References 

Hamlets in Alberta
Designated places in Alberta
Thorhild County